Kleiman is a surname. Notable people with the surname include:

 Ariel Kleiman (born 1985), Australian director
 Bernard Kleiman (1928–2006), lawyer
 Dave Kleiman (1967–2013), American forensic computer expert
 Devra G. Kleiman (1942–2010), American biologist 
 Johannes Kleiman (1896–1959), Dutch helper of the Frank family
 Mark A. R. Kleiman (born 1951), American academic drug policy authority
 Michael Kleiman, documentary filmmaker 
 Naum Kleiman (born 1937), historian of cinema
 Pascal Kleiman (born 1968), disc jockey
 Steven Kleiman (born 1942), American mathematician
 Vladimir Kleiman (1930–2014), Russian scientist 
 Zach Kleiman (born 1988), American basketball executive

See also
 Klee

Jewish surnames
Yiddish-language surnames